Black July was an anti-Tamil pogrom that occurred in Sri Lanka during July 1983. The pogrom was premeditated, and was finally triggered by a deadly ambush on 23 July 1983, which caused the death of 13 Sri Lanka Army soldiers, by the Tamil militant group Liberation Tigers of Tamil Eelam (LTTE). Although initially orchestrated by members of the ruling UNP, the pogrom soon escalated into mass violence with significant public participation.

On the night of 24 July 1983, anti-Tamil rioting started in the capital city of Colombo and then spread to other parts of the country. Over seven days, mainly Sinhalese mobs attacked, burned, looted, and killed Tamil civilians. Estimates of the death toll range between 400 and 3,000, and 150,000 people became homeless. Around 8,000 homes and 5,000 shops were destroyed. The economic cost of the riots was estimated to be $300 million. The NGO International Commission of Jurists described the violence of the pogrom as having "amounted to acts of genocide" in a report published in December 1983.

Sri Lankan Tamils fled to other countries in the ensuing years, and a large number of Tamil youth joined militant groups. Black July is generally seen as the start of the Sri Lankan Civil War between the Tamil militants and the government of Sri Lanka. July became a period of remembrance for the Sri Lankan Tamil diaspora community around the world.

Background

During the period of British colonial rule, many Sri Lankan Tamils, particularly those from the Jaffna peninsula, benefited greatly from educational facilities established by American missionaries. As a result, the colonial administration recruited many English-speaking Tamils to the civil service and other professions on a merit basis. By 1956, 50% of clerical jobs were held by Tamils, although they were a minority of the country's population. Sinhalese leaders saw this imbalance as a problem that needed rectifying.

In 1956, the Official Language Act, commonly known as the Sinhala Only Act, was introduced. Up until that time, English was the country's official language, despite being spoken by only five percent of the population. The use of Sinhala, spoken by 75 percent, and Tamil, spoken by 25 percent, had been restricted by various policies during the colonial period. This new act replaced English with Sinhala as the nation's official language. Protests against the Sinhala-only policy by Tamils and by the nation's leftist parties were met with mob violence that eventually escalated into the riots of 1958. Political parties and groups representing Tamil Sri Lankans felt that the implementation of the Sinhala Only Act deprived the Tamil populations in the north and east of the country of their right to fully participate in government and as an injustice against ethnic minorities.

In 1958, the Tamil political leadership acquiesced to a formula of Sinhala as the official language, but with a "reasonable use of Tamil" being allowed. Only the leftist parties opposed this, holding out for parity between the two languages. However, after the Tamil people gave an overwhelming mandate to the Tamil nationalist Illankai Tamil Arasu Kachchi (Federal Party), which had agreed to a subordinate status for the Tamil language, the leftist parties eventually abandoned their support for parity.

Throughout the 1960s, protests, and state repression in response, created further animosity. In 1972, the policy of standardization, which restricted Tamils' entry into universities, strained the already tenuous political relationship between the elites of the Tamil and Sinhalese communities. The quota affecting political representation became another cause for contention between Sinhalese and Tamil people. There was also a series of anti-Tamil pogroms in 1977, following the United National Party's (UNP) coming to power, which further increased hostility. In 1981, the renowned public library in Jaffna was burnt down by a violent Sinhalese mob. Until 1983, there were similar incidents of low-level violence between the government and the mushrooming Tamil militant groups. There were many murders, disappearances, and cases of torture attributed to the Sri Lankan security forces.

Black July

Saturday, 23 July
On 23 July 1983 at around 11:30 pm, the rebel group Liberation Tigers of Tamil Eelam (LTTE; also known as the Tamil Tigers) ambushed the Four Four Bravo military patrol in Thirunelveli, near Jaffna in northern Sri Lanka. A roadside bomb was detonated beneath a jeep that was leading the convoy, injuring at least two soldiers on board. Soldiers travelling in the truck behind the jeep then dismounted to help their fellow soldiers. Subsequently, they were ambushed by a group of Tamil Tiger fighters who fired at them with automatic weapons and hurled grenades. In the ensuing clash, one officer and twelve soldiers were killed, with two more fatally wounded, for a total of fifteen dead. A number of the rebels were also killed. Col. Kittu, a regional commander of the LTTE, would later admit to planning and carrying out the ambush. This attack has been described as retaliation for the killing of one of the LTTE's founding members, Charles Anthony, by Sri Lankan forces and for the allegation of abducting three Tamil school girls in Jaffna, raping them in their military camp.

Sunday, 24 July

In response to the ambush, truckloads of Sri Lankan soldiers left the Palaly camp, smashing all the shops on the way to Thirunelveli. 51 Tamil civilians in Jaffna were subsequently massacred by the rampaging army in revenge.

The Army—including its commander, Tissa Weeratunga—decided that the soldiers' funerals shouldn't be held in Jaffna because of the high likelihood of disturbances at multiple locations. The decision was made to hold the funerals, with full military honours, at Kanatte Cemetery, Colombo's main burial ground, instead. Prime Minister Ranasinghe Premadasa, fearing violence, was against holding the funeral in Colombo, but was overruled by President J. R. Jayewardene. The president, the prime minister, and the rest of the cabinet were to attend the funeral, which was to take place at 5 pm on 24 July. This arrangement went against the standard procedure of handing over fallen soldiers to their families for burial in their home villages.

Preparations were made for the funeral, including putting the riot squad at the police station in nearby Borella on standby; but by 5 pm the bodies hadn't arrived in Colombo. The soldiers' families wanted the bodies handed over to them and to be buried according to tradition. Due to procedural issues, the bodies were still at Palali Army Camp near Jaffna. The bodies were eventually moved from Palali Air Force Base shortly after 6 pm. Whilst this was occurring, tensions were growing at Colombo General Cemetery because of the delay. A large crowd, including around 3,000 people from the Wanathamulla slum, started gathering at the cemetery, angered by news of the ambush, which was magnified by wild rumour.

The Avro plane carrying the bodies arrived at Ratmalana Airport at 7:20 pm, by which time the crowd at the cemetery had swollen to more than 8,000. The crowd wanted the bodies to be handed over to the families rather than to be buried at the cemetery. Violence broke out between the crowd and police, and the riot squad was summoned. The riot squad then fired tear gas at the crowd and baton-charged them before handing control of the situation over to the army. The president then decided to cancel the military funeral and hand the bodies over to the families. The vehicles carrying the bodies had been driven away from Ratmalana at 8:30 pm and the drivers were heading to the cemetery. Due to the situation, the bodies were then diverted to army headquarters, so that they could be handed over to the families. The crowd at the cemetery was informed of the president's decision at around 10 pm. The crowd left the cemetery in a restive mood.

A section of the crowd marched up D. S. Senanayake Mawatha to Borella, where they destroyed Tamil-owned Nagalingam Stores. The mob—which by that time numbered around 10,000—attacked, looted, and set fire to any building near Borella Junction that had a Tamil connection, including Borella Flats and the Tamil Union Cricket and Athletic Club. Then houses belonging to Tamils in the neighbourhood were targeted. The police fired tear gas at the crowd; but after exhausting all of their stock, they were then forced to fire their rifles into the air. The crowd then dispersed in the direction of Dematagoda, Maradana, Narahenpita, Grandpass, and Thimbirigasyaya, where they attacked and looted Tamil properties and set them alight. Members of criminal gangs came to join the ensuing chaos.

Monday, 25 July
President Jayewardene convened the country's Security Council at the President's House, at 9:30 a.m. on 25 July. A hundred yards away, the Bristol building, and the Tamil-owned Ambal Cafe, was ablaze. Also close by, on York Street, the Tamil-owned clothier Sarathas was ablaze as well. Soon all the Tamil-owned shops on Baillie Street opposite the President's House were on fire. Every Tamil-owned business in the Fort area was on fire by the time the Security Council meeting finished. The President ordered a curfew in Colombo from 6 pm. The mob moved on to Olcott Mawatha, where they set fire to the Tamil-owned Ananda Bhawan food store, Rajeswari Stores, and the Ajantha Hotel.

The President's ministers were seen that morning in various parts of Colombo directing their thugs to attack Tamils and their properties. Cyril Mathew was seen in Colombo Fort, R. Premadasa’s trusted henchmen, mainly pavement hawkers, in Pettah, Colombo Mayor’s thugs and municipal labourers and Transport minister M. H. Mohamed’s men in Borella, District Minister Weerasinghe Mallimarachchi’s thugs in Colombo north and Deputy Minister Anura Bastian’s thugs in Colombo South.

By 10 am, the rioting had spread to the slums of Canal Bank, Grandpass, Hattewatte, Kirilapone, Kotahena, Maradana, Modara, Mutwal, Narahenpita, Slave Island, and Wanathamulla. Mobs armed with crowbars and kitchen knives roamed the streets, attacking and killing Tamils. Wellawatte and Dehiwala, which contained the largest number of Tamils in Colombo, were the next target of the mob. Homes and shops were attacked, looted, and destroyed. Tamil shops on Main Street and Bo Tree Junction were also attacked. The riots then spread to the middle-class residential areas of Anderson Flats, Elvitigala Flats, Torrington Flats, and Thimbirigasyaya. Tamil targets in the exclusive Cinnamon Gardens were also attacked, as were those in the suburbs of Kadawatha, Kelaniya, Nugegoda, and Ratmalana. The residence of the Indian High Commissioner was also attacked and ransacked. By lunchtime, virtually the entire city was on fire. The curfew was advanced to 4:00 pm and then to 2:00 pm, and it was extended to include Gampaha District, due to the violence spreading as far as Negombo. In Kalutara, the TKVS Stores were set on fire. The owner jumped out of an upstairs window, but the mob threw him back into the fire. The curfew was then extended to Kalutara District.

The police being unable, or unwilling, to enforce the curfew, the army was called in to assist the police.

The rioters started to use voter registration lists to target Tamils. The possession of electoral lists by the mobs, which enabled them to identify Tamil homes and property, implied prior organization and cooperation by elements of the government. As President Jayewardene would later admit in a statement, "a pattern of organization and planning has been noticed in the rioting and looting that took place." Eighty-one out of the 92 Tamil-owned flats at Soysa Flats were attacked, looted, and set on fire. The mob attacked the industrial area of Ratmalana, which contained a number of Tamil-owned factories. Jetro Garments and Tata Garments on Galle Road were completely gutted. Other factories attacked included Ponds, S-Lon, Reeves Garments, Hydo Garments, Hyluck Garments, AGM Garments, Manhattan Garments, Ploy Peck, Berec, and Mascons Asbestos. Indian-owned factories such as Kundanmals, Oxford, and Bakson Garments were  attacked, giving credence to the suggestion that the mob was deliberately going after Sri Lankan Tamil targets. Seventeen factories were destroyed in Ratmalana. Capital Maharaja, a Tamil-owned company, is one of Sri Lanka's largest conglomerates. Six of their factories in Ratmalana and their headquarters in Bankshall Street were destroyed. The mob ended the day by setting fire to Tilly's Beach Hotel in Mount Lavinia.

One of the most notorious incidents of the rioting took place at the Welikada Prison on 25 July. Thirty-seven Tamil prisoners, most of them detained under the Prevention of Terrorism Act, were killed by Sinhalese prisoners using knives and clubs. Survivors claimed that prison officers allowed their keys to fall into the hands of Sinhalese prisoners; but at the subsequent inquest, prison officers claimed that the keys had been stolen from them.

While a number of Tamils fled the city, many Sinhalese and Muslims saved the lives and properties of Tamils despite the activities of the gangs. Many Tamils were sheltered in government buildings, temples as well as Sinhalese and Muslim houses in the following days.

Outside of the Western Province, there was violence in Galle, Kegalle, Trincomalee, and Vavuniya.

Tuesday, 26 July
The mob attacks continued in Wellawatte and Dehiwala on 26 July. There were 53 houses on Ratnakara Road. The 24 Tamil owned/occupied houses were burnt. Three houses had Sinhalese owners but were rented by Tamils. The mob removed the property from these three houses out to the road and burnt it. The three houses were not burnt down, neither were the 26 Sinhalese owned/occupied houses. In many parts of the city, the Army merely looked on as property was destroyed and people were killed.

The violence spread to the country's second largest city, Kandy, on 26 July. By 2:45 pm Delta Pharmacy on Peradeniya Road was on fire. Soon afterwards, a Tamil-owned shop near the Laksala building was set on fire; and the violence spread to Castle Street and Colombo Street. The police managed to get control of the situation, but an hour later a mob armed with petrol cans and Molotov cocktails started attacking Tamil shops on Castle, Colombo, King's, and Trincomalee streets. The mob then moved on to nearby Gampola. A curfew was imposed in Kandy District on the evening of 26 July.

In Trincomalee, false rumours started spreading that the LTTE had captured Jaffna, that the Karainagar Naval Base had been destroyed, and that the Naga Vihare had been desecrated. Sailors based at Trincomalee Naval Base went on a rampage, attacking Central Road, Dockyard Road, Main Street, and North Coast Road. The sailors started 170 fires before returning to their base. The Sivan Hindu temple on Thirugnasambandan Road also was attacked.

The curfew was extended nationwide on 26 July as a precautionary measure. There were more outbreaks of violence and looting against Tamils in areas where various ethnic groups had coexisted. By the evening of 26 July, the mob violence began to slacken as police and army units patrolled the streets in large numbers and began to take action against the rioters. The soldiers killed in the Thirunelveli ambush were quietly buried during the night curfew.

Wednesday, 27 July
In the Central Province, the violence spread to Nawalapitiya and Hatton. Badulla, the largest city in neighbouring Uva Province, had so far been peaceful; but around 10:30 a.m. on 27 July, a Tamil-owned motorcycle was set on fire in front of the clock tower. Around midday an organised mob went through the city's bazaar area, setting shops on fire. The rioting then spread to residential areas, and the homes of many Tamils were burnt down. The mob then left the city in vans and buses that they had stolen and headed for Bandarawela, Hali-Ela, and Welimada, where they continued to set properties on fire. The riot had spread to Lunugala by nightfall.

The daytime curfew in Colombo was lifted on 27 July, and the day began in relative calm. But then at Fort Railway Station, a train heading for Jaffna was stopped as it was pulling out of Platform One after cartridges were found on the track. Sinhalese passengers on the train started attacking Tamil passengers, killing twelve. Some Tamils were burnt alive on the railway tracks.

Following the riot at Welikada prison on 25 July, Tamil prisoners had been moved from the Chapel Ward to the Youth Offenders Building. On the evening of 27 July, Sinhalese prisoners overpowered the guards, armed themselves with axes and firewood, and attacked those Tamil prisoners. Fifteen Tamil prisoners were killed. Two Tamil prisoners and a third prisoner were killed during a riot at Jaffna prison on the same day.

Thursday, 28 July
Badulla was still on fire on 28 July, and the rioting spread from Lunugala to Passara. There was also rioting in Nuwara Eliya and Chilaw. But the violence had subsided in Colombo, Kandy, and Trincomalee.

President Jayewardene and his cabinet met in an emergency session on 28 July. Jayewardene then made a primetime televised address in which he appealed for an end to the violence. Jayewardene blamed the violence on "the deep ill feeling and suspicion that has grown between the Sinhalese and the Tamil people" caused by the calls for an independent Tamil state that began in 1976, when the Tamil United Liberation Front, the largest political party representing the Tamils, had passed the Vaddukoddai Resolution. He blamed the violence committed by the Tamil militants for the way "the Sinhalese people themselves have reacted". Jayewardene vowed that the "Sinhalese people will never agree to the division of a country which has been a united nation for 2,500 years [sic]" and announced that the government would "accede to the clamour...of the Sinhalese people" and ban any party which sought to divide the nation.

Indian Prime Minister Indira Gandhi called Jayewardene on 28 July and informed him of the impact the riots had had in India. She requested that Jayewardene receive Minister of External Affairs P. V. Narasimha Rao as her special envoy. Jayewardene accepted, and a few hours later Rao arrived in Sri Lanka.

Friday, 29 July
Colombo was still calm on 29 July. Tamil residents visited friends and relatives who had taken refuge in the many refugee camps in the city. Around 10:30 a.m. two Sinhalese youths were shot on Gas Works Street. A large crowd gathered at the scene, and soon rumours started circling that the youths had been shot by Tamil Tigers from the Adam Ali building. The building was surrounded by the army, navy, and police who proceeded to fire at the building using submachine guns and semi-automatic rifles. A helicopter also fired at the building with a machine gun. The security forces stormed the building but found no Tamil Tigers, weapons, or ammunition inside. However, rumours began to spread around Colombo that the army was engaged in a battle with the Tamil Tigers. Panicking workers began to flee in any mode of transport they could find. Mobs started gathering in the streets—armed with axes, bricks, crowbars, iron rods, kitchen knives, and stones—ready to fight the Tigers. The Tigers never came, so the mobs turned their attention to the fleeing workers. Vehicles were stopped and searched for Tamils. Any Tamil they found was attacked and set on fire. A Tamil was burnt alive on Kirula Road. Eleven Tamils were burnt alive on Attidiya Road. The police found an abandoned van, on the same road, that contained the butchered bodies of two Tamils and three Muslims. Police shot dead 15 rioters. At 2 pm on 29 July, a curfew came into force which lasted until 5 am on Monday 1 August.

Badulla, Kandy, and Trincomalee were calm on 29 July; but there was violence in Nuwara Eliya, beginning around midday. The Tamil-owned Ganesan and Sivalingam stores were attacked and set on fire. The violence then spread to Bazaar Street and Lawson Road. Violence was also reported in Kegalle District and Matara District. In Kegalle District the violence spread from Dehiowita to Deraniyagala to Avissawella. In Matara District the worst affected areas were Deniyaya and Morawake. There was violence in Chilaw as well.

Indian External Affairs Minister Rao held discussions with President Jayewardene and Foreign Minister A. C. S. Hameed before visiting Kandy by helicopter.

Saturday, 30 July
Violence was reported in Nuwara Eliya, Kandapola, Hawa Eliya, and Matale on 30 July. The rest of the country was quiet. That night the government banned three left-wing political parties—the Communist Party of Sri Lanka, Janatha Vimukthi Peramuna, and the Nava Sama Samaja Party—blaming them for inciting the riots. A few leaders of other groups were arrested, as well.

Government's response

There had been growing tension between the Sinhalese and Tamil communities of Sri Lanka before the actual riots began. With the formation of rebel Tamil groups, there rose an anti-Tamil sentiment among the Sinhalese majority. Although the violence was first started by Sinhalese mobs who had gathered at the Colombo cemetery where the bodies of the soldiers were to be buried, they were later joined by elements associated with Sinhalese political activists involved in the organisation of the riots. During the early stages of the riots, it is alleged that the local police and military stood by and did nothing, or even assisted the mobs. Numerous eyewitness accounts suggest that "in many places police and even military personnel joined the rioters". However, by 26 July the police and army were out in the streets taking some action against the mobs. The government extended the curfew to prevent violence from spreading to other parts of the country. A brief spate of rioting broke out on 29 July, when police shot and killed 15 Sinhalese looters.

The Sri Lankan government was accused from various corners of being complicit during the pogrom and of supporting and encouraging the Sinhalese mobs. President Jayewardene has been accused of failing to condemn the violence or to express sympathy to the survivors, blaming Tamils for bringing it upon themselves, failing to take any meaningful measures to punish the perpetrators of the violence, and praising the mobs as heroes of the Sinhalese people. In an interview with the Daily Telegraph on 11 July 1983, about two weeks prior to the riots, Jayewardene admitted to a reporter:

I am not worried about the opinion of the Jaffna (Tamil) people now. Now we cannot think of them. Not about their lives or of their opinion about us. The more you put pressure in the north, the happier the Sinhala people will be here... really, if I starve the Tamils, Sinhala people will be happy....

Even though some Tamil politicians accused the ruling UNP of not taking appropriate actions to prevent the riots, the government was adamant that it did take vital countermeasures from the very early stages to combat rioters and safeguard the Tamil community. Curfew was enforced immediately after the riots broke out. The attacks, according to the government, were carefully organised; and government properties such as trains, buildings, and buses were the initial targets. Prime Minister Premadasa formed a committee to organise shelter for, and feeding of, an estimated 20,000 homeless Tamils in Colombo. These temporary shelters were situated at five school buildings and an aircraft hangar. After the number of refugees increased to around 50,000, the government, with help from India, took measures to transport Tamils north on ships.

Eyewitness accounts
Mobs armed with petrol were seen stopping passing motorists at critical street junctions. After ascertaining the ethnic identity of the driver and passengers, they set alight the vehicles, with the drivers and passengers trapped inside. Mobs were also seen stopping buses to identify Tamil passengers, who were subsequently knifed, clubbed to death, or burned alive. One Norwegian tourist saw a mob set fire to a minibus with 20 people inside, killing them all. According to eyewitness testimony of a victim who survived the riots, Buddhist monks were among the rioters.

The Tamil Guardian lists more eyewitness testimonies from various sources:

London's The Daily Telegraph (26 July) wrote:

In his book, The Tragedy of Sri Lanka, William McGowan wrote:

The London Daily Express (29 July) wrote:

The Times of London reported on 5 August that "...Army personnel actively encouraged arson and the looting of Tamil business establishments and homes in Colombo", and that "absolutely no action was taken to apprehend or prevent the criminal elements involved in these activities. In many instances, army personnel participated in the looting of shops."

The Economist of 6 August wrote: "...But for days the soldiers and policemen were not overwhelmed; they were unengaged or, in some cases, apparently abetting the attackers. Numerous eyewitnesses attest that soldiers and policemen stood by while Colombo burned."

Paul Sieghart of the International Commission of Jurists stated in Sri Lanka: A Mounting Tragedy of Errors, two months after the riots, that: 
"Clearly this (July 1983 attack) was no spontaneous upsurge of communal hatred among the Sinhala people – nor was it as has been suggested in some quarters, a popular response to the killing of 13 soldiers in an ambush the previous day by Tamil Tigers, which was not even reported in the newspapers until the riots began. It was a series of deliberate acts, executed in accordance with a concerted plan, conceived and organized well in advance".

Casualty estimates
The estimates of casualties vary. According to the Tamil Center for Human Rights (TCHR), its research showed that 5,638 Tamils were massacred, 2,015 had been injured, 466 had been missing for ever, 670 had been raped, and 250,000 were internally displaced. While the government initially stated just 250 Tamils were killed, various NGOs and international agencies estimate that between 400 and 3,000 people, believed to be Sri Lankan Tamils or Hill Country Tamils, were killed in the riots. Fifty-three political prisoners alone were killed in the Welikade prison massacre. Eventually the Sri Lankan government put the death toll at about 300 dead. 

More than 18,000 houses and numerous commercial establishments were destroyed, and hundreds of thousands of Tamils fled the country to Europe, Australia and Canada. Many Tamil youths also joined the various Tamil groups, including the Tamil Tigers.

Prosecutions and compensation
A presidential commission appointed during the subsequent People's Alliance government estimated that nearly 300 people were killed and 18,000 establishments, including houses, were destroyed. The commission recommended that restitution be paid. Thus far no restitution has been paid nor has any criminal proceedings begun against anyone involved.

Remembrance

July has become a time of mourning and remembrance amongst the Sri Lankan Tamil diaspora around the world, which comes together to commemorate the loss of Tamils. This has happened in countries such as Canada, Switzerland, Norway, Denmark, Germany, France, Britain, Australia, and New Zealand.

See also
 Sexual violence against Tamils in Sri Lanka#1983 anti-Tamil pogrom

Notes

References

External links

 Black July: Uncover the truth (1983 anti-Tamil pogrom)
Black July '83 – Extensive survivor stories and documented history about Black July
 Remember, Groundviews Articles from Government Ministers and civil society on the 25th commemoration of Black July and the 50th commemoration of the anti-Tamil riots of 1958
 July still black after twenty years, The official website of the Sri Lankan government
 Horror of a pogrom: Remembering "Black July" 1983 by D. B. S. Jeyaraj 

1983 in Sri Lanka
1983 riots
July 1983 events in Asia
Ethnic riots
Massacres in Sri Lanka
Origins of the Sri Lankan Civil War
Sri Lanka and state terrorism
Human rights abuses in Sri Lanka
Riots and civil disorder in Sri Lanka
History of Sri Lanka (1948–present)
Mass murder in 1983
Pogroms